State Route 365 (SR 365) is a very short two-lane east–west state highway in western Ohio. It is currently the shortest signed state route in Ohio.

This spur route was created in 1934, and runs exclusively in Logan County. At a length of just , SR 365 is one of the shortest state highways in Ohio.

Route description

All of SR 365 exists within Stokes Township in northwestern Logan County. Around 230 vehicles use the route on average each day. SR 365 is one of the shortest state routes in Ohio, and there are no reassurance markers directly on SR 365. There is only one location marker on the route, at the beginning of the road. All of SR 365 is paved in asphalt concrete.

The highway travels amidst a neighborhood of cottages as it heads east, with side streets radiating from it. After several jaunts, SR 365 proceeds south. The highway then arrives at its endpoint at a parking lot for a boat launch serving Indian Lake State Park on the west side of Indian Lake. A small driveway at SR 365's terminus leads back to SR 235/366. Due to the lack of reassurance markers on SR 365, there are no markers marking the end of the route.

History
The spur route was designated in 1934 along the short path that it currently runs, on land that a local farmer, Frank Fox, deeded to the state to connect to Blackhawk State Park (now Indian Lake State Park). No significant changes have taken place to SR 365 since its inception. For decades, it was the state's shortest state route. On October 6, 1962, the Ohio Department of Highways designated the route as part of a  statewide network of scenic routes.

Major intersections

References

External links

365
Transportation in Logan County, Ohio
State highways in the United States shorter than one mile